The Wibault 3 or Wibault Wib 3 C.1 was a French parasol wing prototype fighter aircraft from the 1920s, designed for high altitude operations. Its development was abandoned after repeated materials failure in its supercharger.

Design and development
The Wib 3, or Wib 3 C.1 (the C for Chasseur or fighter, 1 indicating single seat) was Wibault's response to a call from the Service Technique de l'Aéronautique (S.T.Aé, Technical Department of Aeronautics) for a high altitude fighter.

It was an all-metal aircraft in the contemporary sense, with a structure of duralumin but largely fabric covering. A parasol wing, with a cut-out in the trailing edge over the open cockpit, ensured the pilot a good all round view. The wing was straight edged with constant chord and was fitted with long span ailerons. It was braced to the lower fuselage on each side with a pair of parallel, faired struts to about half span. The wing section to half span was moderately thick but thinned outboard, giving an overall maximum lift to drag ratio of almost 20.

The Wib 3 was powered by a  Hispano-Suiza 8Fb upright water-cooled V-8 engine with a Lamblin cylindrical radiator on each side of the fully enclosed cowling. The fuselage was aluminium skinned from its nose to the cockpit; aft, it was fabric covered. Its wire braced, almost triangular tailplane carried split elevators, the inner ends cropped to allow movement of the broad rudder. The Wib 3 had a fixed conventional undercarriage, with mainwheels on a rigid axle supported by a pair of V-struts mounted at the roots of the interplane struts. The axle was enclosed within an aerofoil shaped fairing which added  to the wing area.

On its first flight early in 1923, the Rateau turbo-supercharger was not fitted, its development having been interrupted by repeated failures caused by the difficulty of producing suitable high temperature resistant alloys. As a result, it was cancelled by the (S.T.Aé). The Wib 3 continued its flight testing until the autumn of 1923, after which the high altitude specification was withdrawn.

Specifications

References

Bibliography

Further reading
 

Parasol-wing aircraft
Wibault 03
Wib 3
Single-engined tractor aircraft